"Turn It Up" is a song performed by American recording artist Ultra Naté. Co-written by Brinsley Evans, Lisa Molina, Julien Aletti, Raphael Aletti, Femi Williams, the song was released as the lead single from Ultra Naté's upcoming album Hero Worship.

Composition
In an interview with Miami New Times, Ultra Naté described the song as "more of a disco-pop record" that draws influences from Donna Summer's song "I Feel Love".

Critical reception
Michaelangelo Matos from Resident Advisor described the song as "effortlessly built, but the chorus is its weakest point—the close-voiced, quick-sung up-and-down part, specifically. [...], though—the Auto-tune layers are judicious and give an already sheeny performance some extra shine."

Track listing
Digital download (Club mixes)
 "Turn It Up" (Thrillers Original Extended Mix) – 4:53
 "Turn It Up" (Paul Oakenfold Vocal Mix) – 7:08
 "Turn It Up" (Wawa Club Mix) – 5:48
 "Turn It Up" (Wawa Electro Club Mix) – 6:04
 "Turn It Up" (Muthafunkaz Main Mix) – 7:10
 "Turn It Up" (Ruff Loaderz vs Scott Giles Club Mix) – 6:03

Digital download (Dub/instrumental mixes)
 "Turn It Up" (Paul Oakenfold Dub) – 7:08
 "Turn It Up" (Wawa Dub) – 5:49
 "Turn It Up" (Ruff Loaderz vs Scott Giles Dub) – 6:06
 "Turn It Up" (Muthafunkaz Catch a Beat Down Dub) – 4:53
 "Turn It Up" (Wawa Electro Dub) – 6:02

Charts

References

2011 singles
Ultra Naté songs
Disco songs